Tapoban  is a village in Darchula District in the Mahakali Zone of western Nepal. At the time of the 1991 Nepal census it had a population of 1841 people living in 305 individual households.

Formerly, Tapoban was a village development committee (VDC), which were local-level administrative units. In 2017, the government of Nepal restructured local government in line with the 2015 constitution and VDCs were discontinued.

References

External links
UN map of the municipalities of Darchula District

Populated places in Darchula District